The second season of the American television series Tough as Nails premiered on CBS on February 10, 2021, and concluded on April 14, 2021. The season was won by construction superintendent Scott Henry, with lineman Cyril "Zeus" Ontai III finishing second, and pipe welder Sarah Burkett placing third.

Cast

Notes

Future appearances
Patrick "Freight Train" Hargan appeared on the third season during a package delivery challenge in the third episode.

Cast progress 

 The contestant won Tough as Nails.
 The contestant was declared the first runner-up.
 The contestant was declared the second runner-up.
 The contestant placed the highest in the individual competition and won the challenge.
 The contestant placed the second highest in the individual competition and was ultimately declared safe.
 The contestant was safe from elimination.
 The contestant placed the second lowest in the individual competition but was ultimately declared safe.
 The contestant placed the lowest in the individual competition and competed in the overtime challenge but ultimately survived.
 The contestant was the loser of the overtime challenge and was eliminated from the individual competition.
 The contestant was disqualified from the competition due to breaking the show's rules.

Notes

Team progress

 Won the team challenge.
 Lost the team challenge.

Notes

Production
On August 12, 2020, CBS announced the series was renewed for a second season. Filming took place during fall 2020 with COVID-19 protocols being adapted. On December 8, 2020, it was announced that the season would premiere on February 10, 2021.

Episodes

References

2021 American television seasons
Television series impacted by the COVID-19 pandemic
Tough as Nails